Surender Sodhi (often credited as Surendra Sodhi) is an Indian film score composer. He has composed background scores for notable Hindi films like Deewana, Soldier, Raja Hindustani, Baadshah, Hera Pheri and Special 26.

Partial filmography as Background Score Composer

| 2019| " 3RD EYE"|Hindi|

References

Indian film score composers
Year of birth missing (living people)
Living people